Polanisia dodecandra is a species of flowering plant in the Cleomaceae family, known by the common name redwhisker clammyweed or clammyweed, and there are three subspecies of Polanisia. Usually annual, occasionally perennial, Polanisia is native to North America, and is found throughout much of Canada and the United States. It favors full sun, mesic to dry conditions, and barren, sandy or gravelly soils, even highly disturbed areas where there is little other ground vegetation. It looks similar to a close relative, the spider flower (Cleome).

The scientific name of the genus derives from the fact that the plant has numerous, long stamens of unequal lengths (from Greek polys, "many", and anisos, "unequal"). The name of the species, dodecandra means "having 12 stamens".  The common name clammyweed refers to the sticky, or clammy, residue left on hands after handling the plant.

The stems are covered in glandular hairs, and numerous flowers are borne in terminal racemes (May–October). They contain multiple small reddish brown seeds approx . Polanisia seedpods project upward (whereas Cleome pods project out or down). 

There are several subspecies of 'Polanisia dodecandra, including:
 Polanisia dodecandra subsp. dodecandra – redwhisker clammyweed
 P. dodecandra subsp. riograndensis – Rio Grande clammyweed (only found in Texas)
 P. dodecandra subsp. trachysperma'' – sandyseed clammyweed.

Uses 
The plant is related to the caper. There are culinary and ceremonial uses.

References

External links

Missouri Plants Photo Profile
Photo gallery

Cleomaceae
Plants described in 1824
Flora of the United States
Flora of Canada